Nokkakivi (translates to "Beak Rock") is an amusement park in Lievestuore, Laukaa, Finland. Nokkakivi is owned by Bellingham Oy. It is the newest amusement park in Finland, although for the time being it has only a limited number of pre-owned rides on its ride list.

One ride is especially notable in the Nokkakivi park because of its long operational history in Finnish amusement parks. Round Up has been in three other Finnish amusement parks: 1961–1976 in Linnanmäki, 1977 in Särkänniemi and 1986–2002 in Tykkimäki, before it came to Nokkakivi park for its opening season.

Rides and attractions

Major rides

Family rides

Kiddie rides

Attractions

References

External links

Official homepage in English

Amusement parks in Finland
Buildings and structures in Central Finland
Mazes
Amusement parks
Laukaa
Tourist attractions in Central Finland Region
2007 establishments in Finland
Amusement parks opened in 2007